is a Japanese track and field sprinter. He won a silver medal in the 4 × 400 metres relay at the 2013 Asian Championships.

Personal bests

International competition

References

External links

Kazuya Watanabe at Mizuno Track Club  (archived)

1988 births
Living people
Japanese male sprinters
Sportspeople from Miyagi Prefecture